Guzmania steyermarkii is a plant species in the genus Guzmania. This species is endemic to the State of Bolívar in Venezuela.

References

steyermarkii
Flora of Venezuela
Plants described in 1961